The 2018 Fresno FC season is the club's first season in the United Soccer League, the second tier of the American soccer pyramid.

Current squad

Transfers

In

Out

Friendlies

Preseason

Postseason 

Source:

Competitions

USL

Table

Results

U.S. Open Cup

Statistics

See also 
 Fresno FC
 2018 in American soccer
 2018 USL season

References

External links 

Fresno FC seasons
Fresno FC